Breg pri Komendi is a small settlement in the Municipality of Komenda in the Upper Carniola region of Slovenia.

Name
The name of the settlement was changed from Breg to Breg pri Komendi in 1955.

References

External links 

Breg pri Komendi on Geopedia

Populated places in the Municipality of Komenda